Mercatus may refer to:

Mercatus (bug), a genus of shield bugs in the subfamily Phyllocephalinae
Mercatus (festival), a Roman festival

See also
Mercatus Center, a think tank at George Mason University